Gustaf Adolf Viktor Blomgren (24 December 1887 – 25 July 1956) was a Swedish diver who competed in the 1912 and 1920 Summer Olympics. In 1912 he won the bronze medal in the 10 m platform. Eight years later he finished fourth in the 3 m springboard and in the 10 m platform events. During his diving career Blomgren won five Swedish titles in the springboard and platform. He worked for the Gothenburg tram services.

References

1887 births
1956 deaths
Swedish male divers
Olympic divers of Sweden
Divers at the 1912 Summer Olympics
Divers at the 1920 Summer Olympics
Olympic bronze medalists for Sweden
Olympic medalists in diving
Medalists at the 1912 Summer Olympics
Divers from Gothenburg
19th-century Swedish people
20th-century Swedish people